Nícolas David Andrade (born 12 April 1988), known as Nícolas, is a Brazilian professional footballer who plays as a goalkeeper for Serie B club Pisa.

Club career
On 14 January 2021, he signed a six-month contract with Serie B club Reggina.

On 10 June 2021, he signed a two-year contract with Pisa.

References

External links

1988 births
Living people
Brazilian footballers
Brazilian expatriate footballers
Serie A players
Serie B players
Villa Nova Atlético Clube players
Tombense Futebol Clube players
Hellas Verona F.C. players
S.S. Virtus Lanciano 1924 players
Trapani Calcio players
Udinese Calcio players
Reggina 1914 players
Pisa S.C. players
Expatriate footballers in Italy
Brazilian expatriate sportspeople in Italy
Association football goalkeepers
Sportspeople from Rondônia